György Szalai (born 14 February 1951) is a retired Hungarian heavyweight weightlifter who won a bronze medal at the 1980 Olympics.

References

1951 births
Living people
Olympic weightlifters of Hungary
Weightlifters at the 1980 Summer Olympics
Olympic bronze medalists for Hungary
Hungarian male weightlifters